Area code 872 is a North American Numbering Plan overlay of telephone area codes 312 and 773 in Chicago, Illinois, and entered service on November 7, 2009.  Its overlay status means it is assigned only to new numbers in the area and not to existing numbers using the 312 and 773 area codes.  It is the third overlay area code in the region and the tenth area code to serve northeast Illinois.  

As early as 1998, Neustar, which administers the North American Numbering Plan, had recommended a third area code for Chicago, estimating that 312 and 773 would both exhaust by 2001. However, the Illinois Commerce Commission implemented a series of conservation measures that staved off the need for a new area code. By 2008, a combination of population growth and a large growth in cell phone usage forced the implementation of 872.

With the implementation of 872, all local calls in Chicago must be dialed with the full 11-digit phone number (10 digits from cell phones).  

The Illinois side of the Chicago area–312/773/872, 708/464, 847/224, 630/331 and portions of 815/779–is one of the largest local calling areas in the United States; with few exceptions, no long-distance charges are applied from one portion of the metro area to another.

References

External links
Map of Illinois area codes at North American Numbering Plan Administration's website
 List of exchanges from AreaCodeDownload.com, 872 Area Code

872
Chicago
872